Chromosome 16 open reading frame 58, or C16orf58, also known as  FLJ13638 is a protein which in humans is encoded by the C16orf58 gene. The gene itself is 18892 bp long, with mRNA of 2760 bp, and a protein sequence of 468 amino acids. There is a conserved domain of unknown, DUF647. No function has been determined for this gene yet, but it is predicted that it resides in the endoplasmic reticulum in the cytoplasm.

Species distribution 

C16orf58 has very interesting conservation in that it has orthologs back through plants and fungi. However, it has not been found in reptiles, birds, or amphibians. The below table shows some, but not all, orthologs which were found using BLAST.

Protein Interactions 

Though the function is still unknown, C16orf58 has been shown to interact with three different proteins:

 MVD MVD stands for disphosphomevalonate decarboxylase which is an enzyme which functions in cholesterol biosynthesis.
 BSCL2 BSCL2 is the Bernardinelli-Seip congenital lipodystrophy 2, or seipin.  It located in the endoplasmic reticulum and is thought to be important in the lipid droplet morphology.
 TSC22D4 The third interacting protein is TSC22D4,  TSC22 domain family member 4, and functions as a leucine zipper translational regulation.

Structure 

Although there are several sites that will give predictions on protein structure, C16orf58 does not have a known structure yet. That being said there is at least one transmembrane domain, if not more. Within the protein structure there are several extended areas with uncharged amino acids, these could be possible transmembrane domains, or hydrophobic cores. The below shows the charge of each of the amino acids in the protein sequence, + for positive, - for negative and 0 for uncharged. Note the large segments of uncharged amino acids appear bolded. These stretches of uncharged amino acids are conserved back through distant orthologs.
       1  00—000-00 000-00000- 0+00+000-0 0000-0000+ 00000+0000 +0-0+-00-0 
      61  0000000000 0000000000 000-0000-0 000000-000 0000000000 0000000000 
     121  0000+00000 0000000+-0 00000+0000 00+00+0-00 0+00+000-0 00-00000-0 
     181  0000000000 000000000+ 0000000000 +00000000+ +0000-000+ -000-00000 
     241  0000000000 0000000000 0000000000 000000+00+ 0000-000-0 +0+000+000 
     301  0+0-00-000 00+0-00000 0000000000 0000+00000 0-00000-00 0-000000-0 
     361  0000000000 0+000+000+ 0000000000 000-00000- 0—0+0+0+0 00++-00000 
     421  +-00-00-00 00+00+000- 000+0-+000 -00-0+0000 000-++00

References

External links